Wyman may refer to:
Alfred Lee Wyman (1874–1953), United States federal judge
Bill Wyman (born 1936), British bassist born William George Perks Jr.
Brad Wyman (born 1963), American film producer
Charles E. Wyman, chair of the Ford Motor Company and professor at the University of California, Riverside
Dave Wyman (born 1964), American football player
David Wyman (1929–2018), American historian
Devin Wyman (born 1973), American football player
Eldon P. Wyman (1917–1941), ensign of the U.S. Navy
George Adams Wyman (1877–1959), first person to make a transcontinental crossing of the United States on a motor vehicle 
George Herbert Wyman (1860 – c. 1900), American architect
Helen Wyman (born 1981), British cyclist
Ida Wyman (1926–2019), American photographer
Irma Wyman (1928–2015), American computer engineer and business executive
Isaac Wyman (1724–1792), colonel of the American Revolutionary War
Jane Wyman (1917–2007), American actress
Jeffries Wyman (1814–1874), American naturalist, brother of Morrill Wyman
John Wyman, British actor 
Kim Wyman (born 1962), Secretary of State of Washington  
Lance Wyman (born 1937), American graphic designer
Laurence Wyman, American saxophone teacher
Lillie Buffum Chace Wyman (1847–1929), American author and social reformer 
Loraine Wyman (1885–1937), American folksinger
Louis C. Wyman (1917–2002), U.S. representative and Senator
Morrill Wyman (1812–1903), American physician, brother of Jeffries Wyman
Nancy Wyman, (born 1946), Lieutenant Governor of Connecticut
Nick Wyman (born 1950), American actor
Oliver Wyman (actor) (born 1966), American voice actor
Peter Wyman, British accountant
Phil Wyman (1945–2019), American politician
Robert H. Wyman (1822–1882), American admiral
Robert Wyman (1909–1978), British ice hockey player
Rosalind Wiener Wyman (born 1930), Los Angeles City councilwoman
Sid Wyman (1910–1978), American poker player
Walter Wyman (1848–1911), Surgeon General of the United States
W. Robert Wyman (1930–2007), Canadian businessman
Willard G. Wyman (1898–1969), American general

See also
Wyman (disambiguation)